Andreas "Andi" Herzog (born 10 September 1968) is an Austrian former footballer and manager who last managed Admira Wacker. As a player, he played as an attacking midfielder, most notably for Werder Bremen. A full international between 1988 and 2003, he won 103 caps and scored 26 goals for the Austria national team. He represented his country at the 1990 and 1998 FIFA World Cups.

Club career
Born in Vienna, Austria, Herzog started his career at local giants Rapid Vienna, but was sent out on loan to city rivals First Vienna during 1987–88. That move proved to be successful and he was soon recalled to Rapid to start the 1988–89 season. He made his name at Rapid in the next years to secure a move to Bundesliga side Werder Bremen where he would spend eight years, divided in two periods by a season at Bayern Munich where he won the UEFA Cup, beating Girondins de Bordeaux in a two-legged final.

After returning to Rapid in 2002, he decided to end his career with Major League Soccer franchise Los Angeles Galaxy in 2004. Under head coach, Sigi Schmid, Herzog played well but following a mid-season coaching change, he saw his playing time decrease and at the end of the season, Herzog announced his retirement from football on 10 November 2004.

A stylish attacking midfielder, Herzog was well known for his ability to score stunning free-kicks. He captained the Rapid Wien side and was chosen in Rapid's Team of the Century in 1999.

International career
Herzog made his debut for Austria in an April 1988 friendly match against Greece and was a participant at the 1990 and 1998 World Cups, scoring one goal in the latter tournament, a spot kick against Italy. He earned 103 caps, scoring 26 goals, making him Austria's most capped player of all-time. Herzog surpassed striker Anton Polster in May 2002 when winning his 96th cap against Germany. His last international was an April 2003 friendly match against Scotland.

Managerial career
On 23 January 2015, Herzog was named coach of USA's under 23s.

On 1 August 2018, Herzog was announced as coach of Israel's national team, a move which was divisive due to his last minute strike to deny them a play off place in their World Cup 2002 qualifier. Famous midfielder Eyal Berkovic said of the appointment, "Whoever made this decision needs urgent psychiatric attention, I can't think of any other explanation for the appointment. It's a huge disgrace." On 24 June 2020, he left his position after almost two years in charge, while Israel's Sports Director and Austrian colleague of his Willibald Ruttensteiner replaced him as Israel's head coach.

Personal life
Andreas Herzog is married, has two sons and lives in Breitenfurt bei Wien.

His father is Anton "Burli" Herzog (* 1941), who played in the Austrian Bundesliga between 1961 and 1975 for clubs like Austria Wien, Wiener Sport-Club and Admira/Wacker Mödling. Herzog junior grew up with his family in Vienna-Meidling, where he attended Singrienergasse grammar school.

Career statistics

Club

International
Scores and results list Austria's goal tally first, score column indicates score after each Herzog goal.

Honours
Rapid Wien
 Austrian Football Bundesliga: 1986–87, 1987–88

Werder Bremen
 Bundesliga: 1992–93
 DFB-Pokal: 1993–94, 1998–99
 DFL-Supercup: 1993, 1994

Bayern Munich
 UEFA Cup: 1995–96

Individual
 Austrian Footballer of the Year: 1992
 kicker Bundesliga Team of the Season: 1994–95

Managerial statistics

See also
 List of men's footballers with 100 or more international caps

References

External links
 Player profile and stats – Rapid Archive 
 
 
 

1968 births
Living people
Footballers from Vienna
Austrian footballers
Association football midfielders
SK Rapid Wien players
First Vienna FC players
SV Werder Bremen players
FC Bayern Munich footballers
LA Galaxy players
Austrian Football Bundesliga players
Bundesliga players
UEFA Cup winning players
Major League Soccer players
Major League Soccer All-Stars
Austria international footballers
1990 FIFA World Cup players
1998 FIFA World Cup players
FIFA Century Club
Austrian expatriate footballers
Austrian expatriate sportspeople in Germany
Austrian expatriate sportspeople in the United States
Expatriate footballers in Germany
Expatriate soccer players in the United States
Austrian football managers
Austria national football team managers
Austria national football team non-playing staff
Israel national football team managers
United States men's national soccer team non-playing staff
FC Admira Wacker Mödling managers
Austrian Football Bundesliga managers
Austrian expatriate football managers
Austrian expatriate sportspeople in Israel
Expatriate soccer managers in the United States
Expatriate football managers in Israel
People from Meidling